Canacinae is a subfamily of beach flies in the family of Canacidae.

Tribes & genera
Tribe Canacini Jones, 1906
Canace Haliday in Curtis, 1837
Tribe Dynomiellini Mathis, 1982 
Canacea Cresson, 1924
Chaetocanace Hendel, 1914
Dynomiella Giordani Soika, 1956
Isocanace Mathis, 1982
Trichocanace Wirth, 1951
Xanthocanace Hendel, 1914

References

Canacidae
Brachycera subfamilies